Ngeyi Ruth Kanyongolo, is a Malawian lawyer, academic and businesswoman, who serves as Associate Professor in the Department of Practical Legal Studies at Chancellor College, the largest constituent college of the University of Malawi. Effective 29 June 2020, she concurrently serves as the chairperson of the board of directors of Standard Bank Malawi.

Background and education
Kanyongolo was born in Malawi circa 1966. She attended Malawian schools for her elementary and secondary education. She holds a Bachelor of Laws degree, awarded by the University of Malawi, in 1991. Her degree of Master of Laws was awarded by the University of London. She also obtained a Doctor of Philosophy degree from the University of Warwick in the United Kingdom.

Career
Kanyongolo joined the University of Malawi as a law lecturer in 2000. She has assumed progressively increasing responsibilities as a Senior Lecturer and now  as an Associate Professor. She is an avid human rights activist and a promoter of women's rights. She previously served as Professor and Dean of the Faculty of Law at the University of Malawi. She specialises in business law, gender law, labour law and social security.

Family
Kanyongolo is married to Fidelis (Edge) Kanyongolo, a follow academic at the  University of Malawi.

Other considerations
Kanyongolo previously served as president of Malawi Women Lawyers Society. She also served as vice president of Malawi Law Society. On 24 April 2013, she was appointed to the board of Standard Bank Malawi Plc, a commercial bank and subsidiary of the Standard Bank Group. On 29 June 2020, she was appointed as chairperson of Standard Bank Malawi, replacing Rex Harawa, who retired.

Among her many titles and responsibilities, she sits on the Boards of (a) Tilitonse Foundation (b) Equality Effect of Canada and (c) SASPEN, an Association of Social Protection experts in South Africa.

See also
 List of universities in Malawi

References

External links
 Dr. Ngeyi Ruth Kanyongolo's Research Publications

Living people
1966 births
Malawian women lawyers
University of Malawi alumni
Academic staff of the University of Malawi
Alumni of the University of London
Alumni of the University of Warwick
Blantyre District
People from Blantyre
20th-century Malawian lawyers
21st-century Malawian lawyers